Matt Anger defeated Pat Cash in the final, 7–6(7–3), 7–5 to win the boys' singles tennis title at the 1981 Wimbledon Championships.

Seeds

  Joakim Nyström (quarterfinals)
  Jörgen Windahl (third round)
  Wally Masur (third round)
  Henri Leconte (semifinals)
 n/a
  Pat Cash (final)
  Matt Anger (champion)
  Slobodan Živojinović (second round)

Draw

Finals

Top half

Section 1

Section 2

Bottom half

Section 3

Section 4

References

External links

Boys' Singles
Wimbledon Championship by year – Boys' singles